Noor Jehan is a 1967 Bollywood film produced by Sheikh Mukhtar and directed by Mohammed Sadiq. It featured Meena Kumari, Pradeep Kumar, Helen and Lalita Pawar in lead characters. The film is fictional depiction of life of Nur Jahan, the twentieth (and last) wife of the Mughal emperor Jahangir.
 
Roshan was the music director. Hit songs from the movie include "Aap Jabse Qareeb Aaye Hain" sung by Mohammed Rafi and Asha Bhosle and "Sharaabi Sharaabi" sung by Suman Kalyanpur.

Plot 
When Akbar The Great learnt that his beloved son Salim had turned a rebel he was shocked. Akbar decided to crush the rebellion and the whole nation was grieved. Emotion & Duty crossed swords. Akbar's prestige - Mothers's love and grandmother's affection battled with the sublime love of Salim. Love blossomed stealthily in the lives of Salim and Meherunissa. And as the time passed on it knew no bounds. For Salim and Meherunissa, love was a many pleasured thing. But the world is more cruel than one can think of. And the cruel hands of courtiers created a wide gap between the lovers. Salim was sent to get Gujarat to suppress the rebellion of Pathans. Meherunissa was married to Sher Afghan. But it did not end there, Sher Afghan dreams of an Empire. Salim ruled wisely but was madly in love with Meherunissa. Sher Afghan met the fate of many over-ambitious generals. He was killed. Mehrunissa accused Jehangir, the apostle of justice, for this ghastly deed. The opposite of justice had to face the trail. And the justice was done! It was the justice of Jehangir, it was the justice of God.

Cast 
 Meena Kumari as  Noor Jehan
 Pradeep Kumar as Prince Salim
 Rehman as Emperor Akbar
 Lalita Pawar
 Nigar Sultana
 Johnny Walker
 Mukri
 Helen
 Veena
 Tun Tun
 Murad
 Sheikh Mukhtar
 Sohrab Modi

Awards 
 1968 - Won Filmfare award for Best Art Direction - A. A. Majid

Soundtrack

References

External links 
 
1967 films
1960s historical films
1960s Hindi-language films
1960s Urdu-language films
Urdu-language Indian films
Indian historical films
Films set in the Mughal Empire
Cultural depictions of Jahangir
Cultural depictions of Akbar
Films directed by M. Sadiq